The Enchanted Cottage may refer to:
The Enchanted Cottage (play), a 1923 play by Arthur Wing Pinero
The Enchanted Cottage (1924 film), an adaptation starring Richard Barthelmess and May McAvoy
The Enchanted Cottage (1945 film), another adaptation, featuring Dorothy McGuire and Robert Young